Rebecca Lucile Schaeffer (November 6, 1967 – July 18, 1989) was an American actress and model. She began her career as a teen model before moving on to acting. In 1986, she landed the role of Patricia "Patti" Russell in the CBS comedy My Sister Sam. The series was canceled in 1988, and she appeared in several films, including the black comedy Scenes from the Class Struggle in Beverly Hills. At the age of 21, she was shot and killed by Robert John Bardo, a 19-year-old obsessed fan who had been stalking her. Schaeffer’s death helped lead to the passage in California of legislation aimed at preventing stalking.

Early life
Schaeffer was born November 6, 1967, in Eugene, Oregon, the only child of Jewish parents Danna (née Wilner), a writer and instructor who taught at Willamette University and Portland Community College, and Dr. Benson Schaeffer, a child psychologist. Schaeffer was raised in Portland, where she attended Lincoln High School. She initially aspired to become a rabbi, but she began modeling during her junior year in high school. She appeared in department store catalogs and television commercials, and as an extra in a television film. In 1984, when she was 16, she worked a summer in New York City with Elite Model Management and with her parents' permission stayed in the city to pursue modeling.

Career
While working in New York, Schaeffer attended Professional Children's School. She also had a short-term role on the daytime soap opera Guiding Light.

In late 1984, Schaeffer landed the role of Annie Barnes on ABC's One Life to Live for a stint that lasted six months. During this time, she attempted to further her modeling prospects. At , she was considered too short for high-fashion modeling and struggled to find work. In 1985, she moved to Japan in hopes of finding more modeling jobs, but still encountered difficulty due to her height and weight. She returned to New York City and decided to focus on an acting career.

In 1986, Schaeffer won a small role in Woody Allen's comedy Radio Days, but her character was edited out except for one brief scene. She continued modeling and also worked as a waitress. She appeared on the cover of Seventeen magazine, which caught the attention of television producers who were casting for the comedy My Sister Sam starring Pam Dawber. Schaeffer won the role of Patricia "Patti" Russell, a teenager who moves from Oregon to San Francisco to live with her 29-year-old sister Samantha ("Sam") after the death of their parents. Schaeffer lived with co-star Pam Dawber during her work on the series. My Sister Sam was initially a hit, ranking in the top 25, but it was canceled halfway through its second season in April 1988 due to falling ratings. 

After My Sister Sam, Schaeffer had supporting roles in Scenes from the Class Struggle in Beverly Hills, Voyage of Terror: The Achille Lauro Affair, The End of Innocence, and the television film Out of Time. She also served as a spokesperson for the children's charity Thursday's Child.

Murder
On July 18, 1989, 19-year-old fan Robert John Bardo shot and killed Schaeffer at her home in West Hollywood. At the time of her death, she had been stalked by Bardo for three years. He had previously been obsessed with child peace activist Samantha Smith, who died in a plane crash in 1985. He then wrote numerous letters to Schaeffer, one of which she answered. In 1987, he traveled to Los Angeles hoping to meet with Schaeffer on the set of My Sister Sam, but Warner Bros. security turned him away. He returned a month later armed with a knife, but security guards again prevented him from gaining access. He returned to his native Tucson, Arizona, and lost focus on Schaeffer for a while as his obsession shifted toward pop singers Tiffany, Debbie Gibson and Madonna.

Bardo watched Schaeffer in the black comedy Scenes from the Class Struggle in Beverly Hills in 1989, in which she appeared in bed with another actor. He became enraged by the scene, apparently out of jealousy, and decided that Schaeffer should be punished for "becoming another Hollywood whore". Arthur Richard Jackson had stalked and stabbed actress Theresa Saldana in 1982, and Bardo learned that Jackson had used a private investigator to obtain Saldana's address. Bardo then paid a detective agency in Tucson $250 to find Schaeffer's home address in California's Department of Motor Vehicles (DMV) records. His brother helped him get a Ruger GP100 .357 handgun.

Bardo traveled to Los Angeles a third time and roamed the neighborhood where Schaeffer lived, asking people if she actually lived there. Once he was certain that the address was correct, he rang the doorbell. Schaeffer was preparing for an audition for The Godfather Part III and was expecting a script to be delivered, so she answered the door. Bardo showed her a letter and autograph that she had previously sent him; after a short conversation, she asked him not to come to her home again. He went to a diner nearby and had breakfast, then returned to her apartment an hour later. She answered the door with "a cold look on her face", Bardo later said. He pulled out the handgun and shot her in the chest at point-blank range in the doorway of her apartment building; according to Bardo, she fell and said only, "Why?" Schaeffer was rushed to the emergency room of Cedars-Sinai Medical Center, where she was pronounced dead 30 minutes after her arrival. She was buried at Ahavai Sholom Cemetery in Portland.

Aftermath 

Tucson Police Chief Peter Ronstadt arrested Bardo the next day after motorists reported a man running through traffic on Interstate 10. He immediately confessed to the murder. Marcia Clark, later known for her role as lead prosecutor in the O. J. Simpson murder case, prosecuted the case against him. Bardo was convicted of capital murder in a bench trial and was sentenced to life in prison without the possibility of parole. As a result of this incident, federal law regarding the release of personal information through the DMV was changed. The Driver's Privacy Protection Act, which prevents the DMV from releasing private addresses, was enacted in 1994. Schaeffer's death also helped prompt the 1990 passing of America's first anti-stalking laws, including California Penal Code 646.9.

At the time of her death, Schaeffer was dating director Brad Silberling. Her death influenced his film Moonlight Mile (2002) about a man's grief after his fiancée is murdered. Shortly after Schaeffer's death, Pam Dawber and her My Sister Sam co-stars Joel Brooks, David Naughton, and Jenny O'Hara filmed a public service announcement for the Center to Prevent Handgun Violence in her honor.

Filmography

References

Footnotes

Sources

External links

 The Rebecca Schaeffer Website - In Memoriam
 
 
 Stalking: Legal Aspects of Stalking by Rhonda Saunders, JD
 
 Sitcom Actress Murdered - death prompts anti-stalking legislation. 

1967 births
1989 deaths
1989 murders in the United States
20th-century American actresses
Actresses from Portland, Oregon
American child actresses
American soap opera actresses
American child models
American female models
American film actresses
American television actresses
Jewish American actresses
Burials in Oregon
Deaths by firearm in California
Jews and Judaism in Portland, Oregon
Lincoln High School (Portland, Oregon) alumni
Murdered American Jews
People murdered in Los Angeles
People murdered in California
American murder victims
Female murder victims
20th-century American Jews